The Annual Review of Medicine is a peer-reviewed medical journal that publishes review articles about all aspects of medicine. It was established in 1950. Its longest-serving editors have been William P. Creger (1974–1993) and C. Thomas Caskey (2001–2019).  The current editor is Mary E. Klotman. As of 2022, Journal Citation Reports gives the journal a 2021 impact factor of 16.048, ranking it seventh of 139 titles in the category "Medicine, Research & Experimental".

History
The first volume of the journal was published in 1950 by the nonprofit publishing company Annual Reviews. It noted that the more "active" areas of medicine would be covered in each volume, while other subdisciplines would be covered every two or three years. Its first editor was Windsor C. Cutting. In 1996, it was one of the first Annual Reviews journals to be published electronically.

Editors of volumes
Dates indicate publication years in which someone was credited as a lead editor or co-editor of a journal volume. The planning process for a volume begins well before the volume appears, so appointment to the position of lead editor generally occurred prior to the first year shown here. An editor who has retired or died may be credited as a lead editor of a volume that they helped to plan, even if it is published after their retirement or death. 

 Windsor C. Cutting (1950–1954)
 David A. Rytand (1955–1963)
 Arthur C. DeGraff (1964–1973)
 William P. Creger (1974–1993)
 Cecil H. Coggins (1994–2000)
 C. Thomas Caskey (2001–2019)
 Mary E. Klotman (2020–present)

Abstracting and indexing
The journal is abstracted and indexed in:

References

External links

 

Medicine
English-language journals
Annual journals
Publications established in 1950
General medical journals